Rigney L. "Riggie" Dwyer (April 18, 1896 – August 2, 1944) was a professional football player who was an original member of the Green Bay Packers. He was the Packers star end in 1919 and 1920, prior to the team's move into the National Football League. In 1920 he suffered the loss of his right leg and right arm while working in the railroad yards. Doctors claimed he had an even chance for recovery despite his injuries.

Prior to his time with the Packers, Dwyer was prominently known in Wisconsin state football circles. From 1913 to 1917 he played end for the Green Bay West High School. During World War I he played football in France. After the war he started with the Packers, playing two years with the team. At the end of the Packers 1920 season, the team sponsored a benefit game between two local teams for Dwyer. The game attracted 5,000 spectators and raised $4,053.02 that went straight to Dwyer. Riggie was also the brother of fellow Packer Dutch Dwyer. He died in 1944.

References

Birth of a Team and a Legend 
1919-1920 Green Bay Packers

Players of American football from Wisconsin
Green Bay Packers players
1896 births
1944 deaths
American military personnel of World War I